Al-Qaysarānī or Ibn al-Qaysarānī may refer to:

Abu ʾl-Faḍl Muḥammad ibn Ṭāhir ibn al-Qaysarānī (1058–1113)
Abū ʿAbdallāh Muḥammad ibn Naṣr ibn al-Qaysarānī (1085–1154)
Abū Muḥammad ʿAbd al-Salām ibn al-Ḥasan ibn al-Ṭuwayr al-Qaysarānī (1130–1220)
Ibrāhīm ibn ʿAbd al-Raḥmān ibn al-Qaysarānī (fl. 1342)